Love It or List It is a Canadian home design TV show currently airing on HGTV,  W Network and on OWN Canada. The show is produced by Big Coat Productions and is based in Toronto and other surrounding areas in Ontario, Canada. The show premiered as a primetime program on W Network on September 8, 2008, and has since aired on OWN Canada as well as HGTV in the United States.

Series overview

Victories for Hilary are families or clients who decided to love their home and stay. Victories for David are families and clients who decided to list and move into a new or better home.

Season 1

Season 2

Season 3

Season 4

Season 5

Season 6

Season 7

Season 8

Season 9

References
Love it or List It Episodes on HGTV website 

Love It or List It
Love It or List It